Things I've Done is the second studio album by Australian singer and songwriter Karise Eden. It was released on 17 October 2014 by Universal Music Australia and debuted at number five on the ARIA Albums Chart.

Reception
Brad S from auspOp called the album "stellar" saying "Maybe it's her voice, which is part Janis Joplin, part Aretha Franklin and all heart, or maybe just the classy production throughout, but this feels like an ‘artist’ album in a way her contemporaries only wish they could pull off." adding "Things I've Done is a triumphant celebration of both Karise's extraordinary voice and the personal obstacles she's had to overcome."

Track listing

Charts

Weekly charts

Year-end charts

Release history

References

2014 albums
Karise Eden albums
Mercury Records albums
Universal Music Australia albums